Kontio may refer to: 

Kontio (icebreaker), a Finnish icebreaker 
A rubber boot model by Nokian Footwear
A truck model KONTIO-SISU
 Oskari Kontio (politician) (fl. 1924–1933), a Finnish MP
 A character in the 2014 film Big Game